Carbendazim is a widely used, systemic, broad-spectrum benzimidazole fungicide and a metabolite of benomyl. It is also employed as a casting worm control agent in amenity turf situations such as golf greens, tennis courts etc. and in some countries is licensed for that use only.

The fungicide is used to control plant diseases in cereals and fruits, including citrus, bananas, strawberries, pineapples, and pomes. It is also controversially used in Queensland, Australia on macadamia plantations. A 4.7% solution of carbendazim hydrochloride, sold as Eertavas, is marketed as a treatment for Dutch elm disease.

Studies have found high doses of carbendazim cause infertility and destroy the testicles of laboratory animals.

Maximum pesticide residue limits (MRLs) have reduced since discovering its harmful effects.  The MRLs for fresh produce in the EU are now between 0.1 and 0.7 mg/kg with the exception of loquat, which is 2 mg/kg.  The limits for more commonly consumed citrus and pome fruits are between 0.1 and 0.2 mg/kg.

References

External links

International Chemical Safety Card

Acetylcholinesterase inhibitors
Fungicides
Endocrine disruptors
Benzimidazoles
Carbamates
Spermatotoxicants
Testicular toxicants